Blood on the Fields is a two-and-a-half-hour jazz oratorio by Wynton Marsalis. It was commissioned by Lincoln Center and treats the history of slavery and its aftermath in the United States of America. The oratorio tells the story of two slaves, Jesse and Leona, as they traverse the difficult journey to freedom. The narrative suggests that the individual freedom and agency of its protagonists is necessarily and inextricably intertwined with the empowerment of the community and nation as a whole. The work received the 1997 Pulitzer Prize for Music, being the first time the prize was ever given for a jazz music composition, an honor that had previously been reserved for classical composers.

Track listing

Disc 1 
 Calling the Indians Out
 Move Over
 You Don't Hear No Drums
 The Market Place
 Soul for Sale
 Plantation Coffle March
 Work Song (Blood on the Fields)

Disc 2 
 Lady's Lament
 Flying High
 Oh We Have a Friend in Jesus
 God Don't Like Ugly
 Juba and a O'Brown Squaw
 Follow the Drinking Gourd
 My Soul Fell Down
 Forty Lashes
 What a Fool I've Been
 Back to Basics

Disc 3 
 I Hold Out My Hand
 Look and See
 The Sun Is Gonna Shine
 Will the Sun Come Out?
 The Sun Is Gonna Shine
 Chant to Call the Indians Out
 Calling the Indians Out
 Follow the Drinking Gourd
 Freedom Is in the Trying
 Due North

Musicians 
 Wynton Marsalis – trumpet, oratory vocal
 Jon Hendricks – vocal
 Cassandra Wilson – vocal
 Miles Griffith – vocal
 Roger Ingram – lead trumpet, oratory vocal
 Marcus Printup – second trumpet, oratory vocal
 Russell Gunn – third trumpet, oratory vocal
 Ron Westray – lead trombone, oratory vocal
 Wayne Goodman – second trombone, oratory vocal
 Wycliffe Gordon – trombone and tuba, oratory vocal
 Walter Blanding – soprano saxophone, oratory vocal
 Wes Anderson – lead alto saxophone, oratory vocal
 Robert Stewart – lead tenor saxophone, oratory vocal
 Victor Goines – tenor, soprano saxophones, clarinet and bass clarinet, oratory vocal
 James Carter – baritone saxophone, clarinet and bass clarinet, oratory vocal
 Regina Carter – violin, oratory vocal
 Michael Ward – violin, oratory vocal
 Eric Reed – piano, oratory vocal
 Reginald Veal – bass, oratory vocal
 Herlin Riley – drums, tambourine, oratory vocal

References 

Pulitzer Prize for Music-winning works
Wynton Marsalis albums
1995 compilation albums
1994 compositions
Columbia Records compilation albums